Bigge may refer to:

People

 Arthur Bigge, 1st Baron Stamfordham (1849–1931), British officer and Royal Private Secretary 
 Charles William Bigge (1773–1849), English banker
 George Bigge (1869–1935), English cricketer and British Army officer
 John Bigge (1780–1843), English judge and royal commissioner
 Thomas Charles Bigge (died 1794), High Sheriff of Northumberland

Other uses
 Bigge (river), a river of North Rhine-Westphalia, Germany